East Wuwei Road is a metro station on Line 15 of the Shanghai Metro. Located at the intersection of East Wuwei Road and West Taopu Road in Putuo District, Shanghai, the station was scheduled to open with the rest of Line 15 by the end of 2020. However, the station eventually opened on 23 January 2021 following a one-month postponement. It is located in between  station to the north and  station to the south.

References 

Railway stations in Shanghai
Shanghai Metro stations in Putuo District
Line 15, Shanghai Metro
Railway stations in China opened in 2021